This list of museums in the U.S. State of Colorado identifies museums (defined for this context as institutions including nonprofit organizations, government entities, and private businesses) that collect and care for objects of cultural, artistic, scientific, or historical interest and make their collections or related exhibits available for public viewing.  Non-profit and university art galleries are also included.  Museums that exist only in cyberspace (i.e., virtual museums ) are not included.


Museums in Colorado

Defunct museums
 Air Services Museum, Colorado Springs
 Climbing Tree Children's Museum, Montrose, closed in 2011
 Colorado History Museum, Denver, closed in 2010, administered by History Colorado, incorporated into the History Colorado Center
 Dinosaur Depot Museum, Cañon City, closed in 2013, exhibits moved to Royal Gorge Regional Museum and History Center
 International Bell Museum, Evergreen, owner died in 2006, collection donated to Hastings College
 Kit Carson Museum, Las Animas, collections now at the John W. Rawlings Heritage Center
 The Laboratory of Art and Ideas at Belmar, Lakewood, closed in 2009
 Morrison Heritage Museum, closed in 2004, Morrison Historical Society
 Mountain Bike Hall of Fame, moved to California in 2014
 Museum of Western Art, Denver
 Trianon Museum and Art Gallery, Denver, closed in 2004
 Vintage Motos Museum, Denver
 World's Wonder View Tower, Genoa, closed in 2013

Gallery

See also
Aquaria in Colorado
Botanical gardens in Colorado
Nature Centers in Colorado
Observatories in Colorado
Wikimedia Commons: Museums in Colorado

References

External links

History Colorado website
Colorado History Museums
Colorado Wyoming Association of Museums
San Luis Valley Museum Association

 
Colorado geography-related lists
Colorado history-related lists
Colorado education-related lists
Lists of buildings and structures in Colorado
Tourism in Colorado
Tourist attractions in Colorado
Colorado, List of museums in